Kakojan College, established on 24 July 1967, is a general degree college situated at Kakojan, in Jorhat district, Assam, India. It is affiliated with the Dibrugarh University.

Departments

Science
Physics
Mathematics
Chemistry
Statistics
Botany
Zoology

Arts
 Assamese
 English
History
Education
Economics
Sociology
Political Science

References

External links

Universities and colleges in Assam
Colleges affiliated to Dibrugarh University
Educational institutions established in 1967
1967 establishments in Assam